Anthony Mossi Ngawi (born 15 May 1994) is a professional footballer who plays as a goalkeeper. Born in France, Mossi represents the DR Congo national football team internationally.

Club career
Mossi is a youth international of BSC Young Boys and Biel-Bienne, and spent his early careers in the lower divisions of Switzerland. He played in the Swiss Challenge League with FC Le Mont, and in 2017 transferred to FC Chiasso.

International career
Mossi was born in France and is of Congolese descent. He debuted for the DR Congo national team in a 1–1 friendly tie with Nigeria on 28 May 2018.

References

External links
 
 
 SFL Profile

1994 births
Living people
Footballers from Paris
French sportspeople of Democratic Republic of the Congo descent
Black French sportspeople
Democratic Republic of the Congo footballers
French footballers
Association football goalkeepers
Democratic Republic of the Congo international footballers
2019 Africa Cup of Nations players
Swiss Promotion League players
Swiss Challenge League players
FC Biel-Bienne players
SR Delémont players
FC Le Mont players
FC Chiasso players
FC Wil players
Neuchâtel Xamax FCS players
Democratic Republic of the Congo expatriate footballers
French expatriate footballers
Democratic Republic of the Congo expatriate sportspeople in Switzerland
French expatriate sportspeople in Switzerland
Expatriate footballers in Switzerland